Cyperus filifolius is a species of sedge that is native to northern parts of South America.

See also 
 List of Cyperus species

References 

filifolius
Plants described in 1837
Taxa named by Carl Sigismund Kunth
Flora of Brazil
Flora of Guyana
Flora of Venezuela